FC Yunit Samara was a Russian football team from Samara. It played professionally from 2006 to 2008. Their best result was 9th place in Zone Ural-Povolzhye of the Russian Second Division in 2006.

External links
  Team history at KLISF

Association football clubs established in 2005
Association football clubs disestablished in 2009
Defunct football clubs in Russia
Sport in Samara, Russia
2005 establishments in Russia
2009 disestablishments in Russia